Cirrochroa menones is a heliconiine butterfly endemic to island of Mindanao in the Philippines.

References

Vagrantini
Butterflies described in 1888
Butterflies of Asia
Taxa named by Georg Semper